Jovita Neliupšienė (born Jovita Pranevičiūtė on 3 January 1980) is a Lithuanian politician, who had been the former Chief Foreign Policy Adviser to President Dalia Grybauskaitė. From September 2020, she is the Chancellor of the Ministry of Foreign Affairs. Neliupšienė had also served as the ambassador to the European Union from 2015 to 2020.

Biography
Jovita Neliupšienė was born in Panevėžys on 3 January 1980.

From 1998 to 2004, she studied at Vilnius University and graduated with a bachelor's and master's degrees in international relations and diplomacy. From 2000 to 2004, she studied law at Mykolas Romeris University. She worked in the Seimas, the Ministry of Foreign Affairs, and the Lithuanian Embassy in Belarus. Since 2006, she taught at Vilnius University Institute of International Relations and Political Science. In 2009, she  defended her doctoral dissertation on the topic “National self-awareness and the formation of statehood: the experience of the CIS countries”, and became an associate professor.

In 2009, she advised President Grybauskaitė, and coordinated the issues of the European Council meetings. In 2012, after Darius Semaška's departure, she became the president's Chief Adviser - Head of the Foreign Policy Group. On 18 August 2015, Neliupšienė became the Lithuanian ambassador to the European Union, until August 2020.

Neliupšienė is one of the 89 people from the European Union against whom Russia has imposed sanctions.

References

1980 births
Living people
Lithuanian diplomats
Vilnius University alumni
Academic staff of Vilnius University
People from Panevėžys